Utøy or Utoy can refer to:

Places
 Utøy, Norway, a village 
 Achernar Island (also known as Utöy), an island off of Antarctica
 Utoy Creek, Georgia, United States

Other uses
 Utøy School, Utøy, Norway
 Utoy (TV series), a Filipino television series
 Utoy, a character in Ang Panday, a Filipino television series
 Utoy, a character in Pugad Baboy, a Filipino comic strip

See also
 Battle of Utoy Creek, an American Civil War battle
 Utøya, an island in Norway
 Utö, Finland, an island in the Archipelago Sea, in southwest Finland
 Utö, Sweden, an island in the Stockholm archipelago in Sweden